A heist is a robbery or burglary, especially from an institution such as a bank or museum.

Heist may also refer to:

Places
Heist, Germany, a municipality in Schleswig-Holstein
Heist-aan-Zee, West Flanders, Belgium
Heist-op-den-Berg, Antwerp, Belgium

People
Al Heist (1927–2006), Major League Baseball outfielder
George Heist (1886–1920), immunologist
Hans-Joachim Heist (born 1949), German actor and comedian
Heist., botanical standard author abbreviation for Lorenz Heister
Monique van Heist (born 1972), Rotterdam-based Dutch fashion designer

Film
Heist film, a subgenre of crime film based on planning and executing a significant robbery
The Heist (1970 film), a French-Italian crime drama
The Heist, aka Dollar$, a 1971 comedy directed by Richard Brooks
The Heist (1976 film), a Mexican crime film
The Heist, aka The Squeeze, a 1977 thriller directed by Michael Apted
The Heist (1989 film), a made-for-TV thriller starring Pierce Brosnan
Heist (2001 film), directed by David Mamet
The Heist (2001 film), directed by Kurt Voss
The Heist (2008 film), directed by Campbell Cooley
The Maiden Heist, a 2009 film starring Morgan Freeman, released as The Heist in the UK
Heist: Who Stole the American Dream?, a 2011 documentary
Heist (2015 film), directed by Scott Mann

Television
Heist (2008 film), a British TV comedy-drama
Heist (TV series) (2006), American TV series
The Heist (Derren Brown special) a 2006 reality program  
The Heist (TV series), a 2018-2020 British reality competition

Episodes
 "The Heist" (American Dragon: Jake Long)
 "The Heist" (Chowder)
 "The Heist" (MacGyver)
 "The Heist" (The Outer Limits)
 "The Heist", 2015 episode of It's Not Crazy, It's Sports directed by Errol Morris

Games

Heist (video game), a planned video game canceled in 2010
Payday: The Heist, a 2011 video game focused on various robberies

Music
¡Heist!, a 2008 EP by The Lights Out
The Heist (album), a hip-hop album by Macklemore & Ryan Lewis
"Heist", a song by Lindsey Stirling from the album Shatter Me
"Heist", a song by Ben Folds from the movie Over the Hedge

Other uses
The Heist (Silva novel), 2014, in the Gabriel Allon series
K.S.K. Heist, a professional football club from Heist-op-den-Berg, Belgium